Acta Médica Portuguesa is a peer-reviewed medical journal covering all aspects of medicine that is published by the Portuguese Medical Association on behalf of the Portuguese Order of Physicians. Types of articles published include: original research, reviews, publishing, and medical imaging perspective. It is an open access journal published under a Creative Commons licence (BY-NC-ND).

History 
 

Acta Médica Portuguesa was established in February 1979. In 1987, the journal was acquired by the Southern Regional Section of the Portuguese Order of Physicians. In March 1989, it became the official journal of the Order of Physicians. Since 2004, the journal has been available only in digital format.

Editors 
The following persons have been editors-in-chief of the journal:
 A. Galvão-Teles (1979-1987)
 F. Veiga Fernandes (1987-1993)
 A. Sales Luís (1993-1996)
 Carlos Ribeiro (1996-1998)
 J. Germano de Sousa (1999-2004)
 Pedro Nunes (2005-2010)
 Rui Tato Marinho (2011–present)

Abstracting and indexing 
Acta Médica Portuguesa is abstracted and indexed in:
 PubMed/Medline
 Science Citation Index Expanded
 Chemical Abstracts 
 EMBASE
 SafetyLit
According to the Journal Citation Reports, the journal has a 2011 impact factor of 0.256, ranking it 145th out of 153 journals in the category "Medicine, General and Internal".

References

External links 
 
 Ordem dos Médicos

General medical journals
Publications established in 1979
Multilingual journals
Bimonthly journals